Kathleen Sue Spielberg (née Nail; born November 3, 1953), known professionally as Kate Capshaw, is a retired American actress. She is best known for her portrayal of Willie Scott, an American nightclub singer and performer in Indiana Jones and the Temple of Doom (1984), directed by eventual husband Steven Spielberg. Since then, she starred in Dreamscape (1984), Power (1986), SpaceCamp (1986), Black Rain (1989), Love Affair (1994), Just Cause (1995), and The Love Letter (1999). Her portraiture work has been shown in the Smithsonian National Portrait Gallery.

Early life
Capshaw was born Kathleen Sue Nail in Fort Worth, Texas, the daughter of Beverley Sue (née Simon), a travel agent and beautician, and Edwin Leon Nail, an airline employee. She moved to St. Louis, Missouri, at the age of five, and graduated from Hazelwood Senior High School in 1972. Capshaw earned a degree in education from the University of Missouri, where she was a member of Alpha Delta Pi. She taught Special Education at Southern Boone High School in Ashland, Missouri, and Rock Bridge High School in Columbia, Missouri. 

She married marketing manager Robert Capshaw in January 1976 and they had one child, Jessica Capshaw, before eventually divorcing in 1980. However, she kept the surname Capshaw, which she used for her professional name upon becoming an actress.

Career

Capshaw moved to New York City to pursue her dream of acting, landing her first role on the soap opera The Edge of Night. After auditioning for a small role in A Little Sex, she was offered the role of the leading lady, which is when she asked for a dismissal from The Edge of Night. She starred in Dreamscape in 1984, and afterwards was directed by her then-boyfriend Armyan Bernstein in Windy City.

She met film director and future husband Steven Spielberg upon winning the female lead as Willie Scott in Indiana Jones and the Temple of Doom (1984), a prequel to Spielberg's Raiders of the Lost Ark (1981). Capshaw starred opposite Harrison Ford, who played Indiana Jones. In addition, she appeared as Andie Bergstrom, an appealing and stern yet frustrated camp instructor in the 1986 film SpaceCamp, opposite Richard Gere and Gene Hackman in Power (1986), and starred as Susanna McKaskel in The Quick and The Dead (1987) with Sam Elliott. Capshaw also starred in the spy film/romance Her Secret Life.

Capshaw had roles in several films throughout the late 1980s into the 1990s. She starred alongside Michael Douglas and Andy García in Black Rain (1989), Sean Connery and Laurence Fishburne in Just Cause (1995), and Warren Beatty and Annette Bening in Love Affair (1994). She was also featured in the 1997 film The Alarmist with David Arquette and Stanley Tucci. In 1999, she starred in and produced The Love Letter.

In 2001, she starred in the Showtime Cable Network TV Movie A Girl Thing, with Stockard Channing, Rebecca De Mornay and Elle Macpherson. She retired from acting after her final screen appearance in the 2001 TV movie, Due East.

Personal life
During the production of the film Indiana Jones and the Temple of Doom (1984), Capshaw became close to director Steven Spielberg, whom she later married. Originally an Episcopalian, she converted to Judaism before marrying Spielberg on October 12, 1991. The two were married in both a civil ceremony and an Orthodox ceremony.

There are seven children in the Spielberg–Capshaw family.

Jessica Capshaw – daughter from Capshaw's previous marriage to Robert Capshaw
Max Samuel Spielberg – son from Spielberg's previous marriage to actress Amy Irving
Theo Spielberg – son adopted by Capshaw before her marriage to Spielberg, who later also adopted him
Sasha Rebecca Spielberg
Sawyer Avery Spielberg
Mikaela George – adopted with Steven Spielberg
Destry Allyn Spielberg

Filmography

Film

Television

References

External links

21st-century American actresses
20th-century American actresses
Actresses from St. Louis
Actresses from Texas
American feminists
American film actresses
American soap opera actresses
American television actresses
Converts to Judaism from Protestantism
Jewish American actresses
Living people
People from Fort Worth, Texas
University of Missouri alumni
Family of Steven Spielberg
1953 births